Robina Qureshi is a Scottish human rights campaigner. She is a critic of the asylum policies of the United Kingdom, and has campaigned to stop inhumane treatment and close detention centres for asylum seekers.

Background 
Qureshi's parents and three older siblings came to Glasgow as immigrants in 1964. She was born later that year. The family lived in the southside and later moved to a suburb in the North West of the city. Her first job was as a trainee employment advice worker, soon after which she realised she wanted to work with minorities.

Human rights work 
Qureshi is the Chief Executive Officer of Positive Action in Housing, a Scottish refugee and migrants homelessness and human rights non governmental organisation that is involved in countering racism and discrimination, particularly in housing. She took up this role in 1995. She has publicly highlighted issues concerning racism and ethnic minorities in the print and visual press since 1990. 

Between 1998 and 2000, Qureshi, together with the human rights lawyer Aamer Anwar, campaigned on behalf of the family of murdered Indian waiter Surjit Singh Chhokhar. She served on the Lawrence Steering Group and has led campaigns to stop extreme far right groups organising or gaining a platform in Scotland.

In 2000, Qureshi talked to the broadcaster Catherine Deveney about her background and motivation for challenging injustice.

In September 2005, Qureshi travelled to Albania on a fact-finding mission after taking up the case of a family who were expelled to Kosovo in two separate dawn raids after living in Glasgow for five years as asylum seekers.

Subsequently, she was at the forefront of challenging dawn raids against Scotland's asylum seekers. She called on Scotland's First Minister Jack McConnell to instruct Strathclyde Police not to cooperate with immigration officials who carry out dawn raids. The police, she said, "surely must despise doing the dirty work of the Home Office and the far right". Malcolm Chisholm MSP, Minister for Communities in the Scottish Executive, joined Qureshi in criticising the "heavy-handed" immigration policies,. Chisolm described Qureshi as "a very formidable campaigner and completely dedicated to the rights of minorities."

In November 2007, Qureshi took up the case of 13-year-old Meltem Avcil, a 13-year-old Kurdish girl from Doncaster, who began self-harming after being detained with her mother at Yarl's Wood Immigration Removal Centre and about to be deported. Enlisting the support of the actress Juliet Stevenson, Sir Al Aynsley, Children's Commissioner, and journalists at The Independent newspaper, including Natasha Walter, Qureshi ran a campaign across the UK and Europe to secure Meltem and her mother's release.

In 2015, at the height of media interest in the Syrian refugee crisis, Qureshi spoke out in a heated debate with Sarah Smith against what she described as the BBC's "doublespeak", criticising the BBC’s constant references to refugees fleeing war and persecution as migrants.

Qureshi has been a critic of UK policies on civil liberties, comparing the British Government's attitude towards the threat of homegrown terrorism and the subsequent impact on the Muslim community to the experience of the Irish in 1970s and 1980s Britain. She stated that, "it has been made very clear that the Muslim community should expect to be singled out as potential terrorists. People feel they are being targeted, just like the Irish were by the British in the 1970s and innocent people went to jail. The difference is this time round the names will be Muslim, rather than Irish."

In 2021, Qureshi won the Chartered Institute of Housing's Alan Ferguson Award for Outstanding Contribution to Housing.

Film work 
Between 2001 and 2005, Qureshi appeared in several films and television dramas, including American Cousins, Buried, The Key, Proof, and the controversial Gas Attack, for which she won a best actress award at the 2001 Cherbourg-Octeville Festival of Irish & British Film.

References

External links 
Positive Action in Housing

1964 births
Living people
People from Glasgow
Scottish human rights activists
Women human rights activists
Scottish people of Pakistani descent
Scottish film actresses
Actresses from Glasgow
Scottish television actresses